Lapa do Lobo is a Portuguese parish in the municipality of Nelas. The population in 2011 was 756, in an area of 7.32 km2.

References

Freguesias of Nelas